East Fairview is a census-designated place and unincorporated community in McKenzie County, North Dakota, United States. Its population was 76 as of the 2010 census. The community is located on the North Dakota-Montana border, which separates it from Fairview, Montana.

Demographics

References

Census-designated places in McKenzie County, North Dakota
Census-designated places in North Dakota
Former municipalities in North Dakota
Unincorporated communities in North Dakota
Unincorporated communities in McKenzie County, North Dakota